Perry is a city in Ralls County, Missouri, United States. The population was 665 at the 2020 census. It is part of the Hannibal Micropolitan Statistical Area.

History
Perry was platted in 1866, and named after William Perry Crostwaite, a first settler.  A post office called Perry has been in operation since 1866.

Greenlawn Methodist Church and Cemetery was listed on the National Register of Historic Places in 2007.

Geography
Perry is located at  (39.428413, -91.671021).

Demographics

2010 census
As of the census of 2010, there were 693 people, 323 households, and 191 families living in the city. The racial makeup of the city was 97.7% White, 0.1% Native American, 1.0% from other races, and 1.2% from two or more races. Hispanic or Latino of any race were 3.5% of the population.

There were 323 households, of which 22.9% had children under the age of 18 living with them, 46.4% were married couples living together, 9.6% had a female householder with no husband present, 3.1% had a male householder with no wife present, and 40.9% were non-families. 34.1% of all households were made up of individuals, and 18.2% had someone living alone who was 65 years of age or older. The average household size was 2.15 and the average family size was 2.74.

The median age in the city was 48.1 years. 18.5% of residents were under the age of 18; 6.2% were between the ages of 18 and 24; 21.3% were from 25 to 44; 32.3% were from 45 to 64; and 21.5% were 65 years of age or older. The gender makeup of the city was 50.8% male and 49.2% female.

2000 census
As of the census of 2000, there were 666 people, 310 households, and 168 families living in the city. The population density was 542.7 people per square mile (209.1/km). There were 431 housing units at an average density of 351.2 per square mile (135.3/km). The racial makeup of the city was 98.65% White, 0.60% African American, 0.60% Native American and 0.15% Asian. Hispanic or Latino of any race were 0.75% of the population.

There were 310 households, out of which 23.5% had children under the age of 18 living with them, 45.8% were married couples living together, 6.8% had a female householder with no husband present, and 45.5% were non-families. 41.6% of all households were made up of individuals, and 24.8% had someone living alone who was 65 years of age or older. The average household size was 2.05 and the average family size was 2.79.

In the city the population was spread out, with 19.2% under the age of 18, 8.0% from 18 to 24, 21.9% from 25 to 44, 23.3% from 45 to 64, and 27.6% who were 65 years of age or older. The median age was 46 years. For every 100 females, there were 78.6 males. For every 100 females age 18 and over, there were 75.8 males.

The median income for a household in the city was $30,625, and the median income for a family was $35,000. Males had a median income of $29,135 versus $17,656 for females. The per capita income for the city was $18,304. About 5.2% of families and 7.4% of the population were below the poverty line, including 7.8% of those under age 18 and 10.1% of those age 65 or over.

References

Cities in Ralls County, Missouri
Hannibal, Missouri micropolitan area
Cities in Missouri